The Armstrong MT500 is a British military motorcycle made by Armstrong-CCM Motorcycles in Bolton, Greater Manchester, who acquired the rights to the Rotax engine enduro motorcycle SWM XN Tornado from the Italian owners and developed the MT500 for use by the British Army.   Electric start models were built for the Canadian and Jordanian armed forces.

In 1987, the design and production rights were sold to Harley-Davidson, who in 1993 released the MT350E. The MT500 is used by Canada, Jordan and the United Kingdom.

Users

Notes

References

See also
Can Am Bombardier
Peugeot SX8

External links
MT350 and MT500 resources at milweb

Motorcycles of the United Kingdom
Military motorcycles
Harley-Davidson motorcycles
Motorcycles introduced in 1983